Vania King and Claire Liu were the defending champions, having won the previous edition in 2019 however King retired from professional tennis in April, whilst Liu chose not to participate.

Hanna Chang and Alexa Glatch won the title, defeating Samantha Murray Sharan and Valeria Savinykh in the final, 7–6(7–3), 3–6, [11–9].

Seeds

Draw

Draw

References
Main Draw

Koser Jewelers Tennis Challenge - Doubles